Andrew Stone (born November 18, 1990) is an American soccer player.

Career

High school
Stone was born in Green Bay, Wisconsin. He attended high school at Green Bay Preble High School where he played soccer as a student athlete under head coach Chris Becker. Stone also played high school club soccer (public league soccer) for green bay lightning under head coach Aldo Santaga.

College
Andrew stone played at the University of Wisconsin-Green Bay (2009-2011). His Freshman year (2009) he appeared in all 20 regular season matches, 6 of which were starts. On September 11 Stone scored his first goal of his collegiate career. It was his only goal of the season. Stone missed the first 6 games of his sophomore season (2010) due to an emergency appendectomy. He Returned to start 13 matches that season. He also scored one goal on the season. Stone started 18 games his Junior year (2011) and scored one goal on the season. Due to NCAA transfer rules Stone was required to red shirt the 2012 season. Stone transferred to the University of Wisconsin–Milwaukee for his senior season (2013). He appeared in 19 matches that season. All of which were starts. He also scored 3 goals on the season. Stone was named the 2013 Horizon League Tournament most valuable player.

Indy Eleven
Stone made his professional debut on May 17, 2014 in a 4-2 defeat to Ottawa Fury FC.

Career statistics

Club

References

1990 births
Living people
American soccer players
Milwaukee Panthers men's soccer players
Indy Eleven players
Association football defenders
Soccer players from Wisconsin
North American Soccer League players
Sportspeople from Green Bay, Wisconsin